Aru (also Romanized as Ārū; also known as Arūd) is a village in Abarshiveh Rural District, in the Central District of Damavand County, Tehran Province, Iran. At the 2006 census, its population was 1,057, in 304 families.

References 

Populated places in Damavand County